In the fictional universe of Star Trek, the Prime Directive (also known as "Starfleet General Order 1", "General Order 1", and the "non-interference directive") is a guiding principle of Starfleet that prohibits its members from interfering with the natural development of alien civilizations. It protects unprepared civilizations from the danger of starship crews introducing advanced technology, knowledge, and values before they are ready. Since its introduction in the first season of the original Star Trek series, the directive has featured in many Star Trek episodes as part of a moral question over how best to establish diplomatic relations with new alien worlds.

The Prime Directive
The Prime Directive is one of many guidelines for Starfleet's mandate to explore the galaxy and "seek out new life and new civilizations." Although the concept of the Prime Directive has been alluded to and paraphrased by many Star Trek characters during the television series and feature films, the actual directive has never been provided to viewers. The most complete attempts to define the directive have come from non-canonical works and include:
The Prime Directive prohibits Starfleet personnel and spacecraft from interfering in the normal development of any society, and mandates that any Starfleet vessel or crew member is expendable to prevent violation of this rule.
and
As the right of each sentient species to live in accordance with its normal cultural evolution is considered sacred, no Starfleet personnel may interfere with the normal and healthy development of alien life and culture. Such interference includes introducing superior knowledge, strength, or technology to a world whose society is incapable of handling such advantages wisely. Starfleet personnel may not violate this Prime Directive, even to save their lives and/or their ship, unless they are acting to right an earlier violation or an accidental contamination of said culture. This directive takes precedence over any and all other considerations, and carries with it the highest moral obligation.

The Prime Directive was frequently applied to less developed planets which had not yet discovered warp travel or subspace communication technology. The Prime Directive was also sometimes applied to advanced civilizations that already knew of life on other worlds but were protected by empires outside the Federation's jurisdiction. First contact could be made by the Federation with alien worlds that had either discovered warp or were on the verge of it, or with highly advanced civilizations that simply hadn't ventured into space yet. In those cases, the Prime Directive was used as a general policy to not disrupt or interfere with their culture when establishing peaceful diplomatic relations.

Consequences for violating the Prime Directive could range from a stern reprimand to a demotion, depending on the severity of the infraction. However, enforcement of these rules -- and interpretations of the Prime Directive itself -- varied greatly and were at the discretion of the commanding officer. In many instances, prominent Starfleet personnel like captains James T. Kirk, Jean-Luc Picard, Kathryn Janeway and Benjamin Sisko willingly broke the Prime Directive but faced no real punishment or consequence for doing so.

However, the Prime Directive is not absolute. Starship captains have been known to violate it to protect their ships and crews, and certain Starfleet regulations such as The Omega Directive can even render it null and void in certain circumstances.

Creation and evolution
Creation of the Prime Directive is generally credited to Original Series producer Gene L. Coon. The Prime Directive reflected a contemporary political view that US involvement in the Vietnam War was an example of a superpower interfering in the natural development of southeast Asian society; the creation of the Prime Directive was perceived as a repudiation of that involvement.

Notable on-screen references

Enterprise 
Although filmed between 2001 and 2005, Star Trek: Enterprise (ENT) is a prequel to Star Trek: The Original Series (TOS) and references are made to the Prime Directive. Most notably in the first-season episode, "Dear Doctor", Captain Jonathan Archer says "Some day, my people are gonna come up with some sort of a doctrine, something that tells us what we can and can't do out here, should and shouldn't do. But until someone tells me that they've drafted that directive, I'm going to have to remind myself every day that we didn't come out here to play God." 
Additionally, in the ENT episodes "Fight or Flight" and "Civilization", references are made to a Vulcan policy of non-interference that imply it may have been a model for Starfleet's Prime Directive.

Discovery 
In "New Eden", the second episode in season two of Star Trek: Discovery aired in 2019, the away party is selected and briefed to ensure that their interactions with humans from pre-warp capable Earth does not interfere with their development. The regulation is exclusively referred to as General Order 1.

Strange New Worlds 

 In "Strange New Worlds", the first episode of the season one of Star Trek: Strange New Worlds, Captain Pike reveals the Enterprise to a society that has reverse engineered a matter-anti-matter reactor as a weapon after witnessing the Battle near Xahea. However, the Federation Council could not address how the weapon was created because the Battle near Xahea was classified information, which prevented them from charging Pike with violating General Order 1. The Federation Council is also considering renaming General Order 1 as the Prime Directive, which Captain Pike says will "never stick".

The Original Series 
The first filmed reference to the Prime Directive occurs in the first season TOS episode "The Return of the Archons" (1966), when Spock begins to caution Captain Kirk of the starship Enterprise when he proposes to destroy a computer controlling an entire civilization. Kirk interrupts him after Spock says, "Captain, our Prime Directive of non-interference" with, "That refers to a living, growing culture..." Later, Kirk argues the computer into self-destruction and leaves behind a team of sociologists to help restore the society to a "human" form.
In the second-season episode "The Apple", Spock says of Kirk's plan to destroy Vaal, "If we do what it seems we must, in my opinion, it will be in direct violation of the non-interference directive."
In the second-season episode "A Piece of the Action", Kirk, briefing Spock and McCoy before beaming down on possible interference 100 years earlier by the Federation ship, the Horizon, Kirk explicitly states, "the 'contact came before the non-interference directive".
In the second-season episode "A Private Little War", two different factions on a planet were at war with each other and it is discovered that the Klingons were furnishing one faction with advanced weapons. Kirk responded by arming the other faction with the same weapons. This resulted in an arms race on that world, as a fictionalized parallel to the then-current Cold War arms race, in which the United States often armed one side of a dispute and the Soviet Union armed the other. 
In a similar storyline on TNG, "Too Short a Season", a Starfleet admiral admits he interpreted the Prime Directive to mean equally arming two different factions on a planet, which resulted in 40 years of war.
In the second-season episode "Patterns of Force," Federation cultural observer and historian John Gill created a regime based on Nazi Germany on a primitive planet in an effort to create a society which combined the high efficiency of a fascist dictatorship with a more benign philosophy. In doing so, he contaminated the normal and healthy development of the planet's culture, with disastrous effects; the regime adopts the same racial supremacist and genocidal ideologies of the original.
In the second-season episode "The Omega Glory", after finding out that Captain Tracy may have violated the Prime Directive, Captain Kirk states, "A starship captain's most solemn oath is that he will give his life, even his entire crew, rather than violate the Prime Directive."
In the second-season episode "Bread and Circuses", the crew discusses that the Prime Directive is in effect, saying, "No identification of self or mission. No interference with the social development of said planet. No references to space, or the fact that there are other worlds, or more advanced civilizations."

The Next Generation 
In the Star Trek: The Next Generation (TNG) first-season episode "Symbiosis", Captain Jean-Luc Picard of the starship Enterprise-D states that, "The Prime Directive is not just a set of rules; it is a philosophy... and a very correct one. History has proven again and again that whenever mankind interferes with a less developed civilization, no matter how well-intentioned that interference may be, the results are invariably disastrous."
 In the third season episode "Who Watches the Watchers", the crew of the Enterprise expose a pre-warp civilization on Mintaka III to Federation technology. Despite an attempted mind wipe, the Mintakans remember and now revere Picard as a god. Picard intentionally breaks the Prime Directive again by beaming one of the Mintakans aboard the Enterprise and explaining they are on a starship, and not gods, showing them their world from space and encouraging them to spread the truth to the others. Eventually, he allowed himself to be shot by an arrow to prove he was mortal.
In the fourth season episode "The Drumhead", the Captain of the Enterprise is being interrogated by retired Admiral Norah Satie, who says the Prime Directive is "Starfleet General Order Number One". She claims that Picard had "violated the Prime Directive a total of nine times since you took command of the Enterprise". (To this he responds "My reports to Starfleet document the circumstances in each of those instances".)
 In the fourth season episode "First Contact", Commander Riker goes undercover to scout a pre-warp civilization that is on the verge of discovering warp technology, preparing to establish diplomatic relations. When he is captured, Captain Picard and Deanna Troi make first contact early, but Picard refuses to share Federation technology with them due to the Prime Directive. After worries of social upheaval, the alien scientists developing warp travel believe their society isn't ready for knowledge of extraterrestrial life, and they ask the Enterprise to leave without announcing their presence to the public, agreeing to delay developing warp technology until their culture is ready.
In the seventh season episode "Homeward", it is said that Starfleet had allowed 60 races to die out rather than interfere with their fate. However, in the episodes "Homeward" and "Pen Pals", the crew debates the Prime Directive and the saving of civilizations.

Deep Space Nine 
In the Star Trek: Deep Space Nine (DS9) first season episode "Captive Pursuit", Commander Sisko references the Prime Directive as his reason for choosing not to interfere in a hunt of a member of sentient species from the Gamma Quadrant that is bred to be hunted. In the end, Sisko does allow Chief O'Brien to assist the hunted being to escape from his captors to continue the hunt.
In the episode "The Circle", the government of the planet Bajor experiences an internal, civil war-like conflict. Starfleet Commander Benjamin Sisko's superior orders him to evacuate all Starfleet personnel from the station, noting, "The Cardassians may involve themselves in other people's civil wars, but we don't."
 In the episode "In the Pale Moonlight", Sisko and Garak plant false evidence to force the Romulans to enter the Dominion War under false pretenses, with full knowledge and approval from Starfleet Command, despite this violating the Prime Directive's edict of not interfering with other cultures or civilizations. Participation in the war by the Romulans resulted in massive military and civilian casualties within Romulan society.

Voyager 
In the Star Trek: Voyager episode "The Omega Directive," an exception to the Prime Directive was introduced. Starfleet's Omega Directive authorizes a captain to take any and all means necessary to destroy Omega particles including interference with any society that creates them.
In the episode "Infinite Regress", Naomi Wildman informs Seven of Nine that she was familiar with the Prime Directive including all 47 suborders.
In the episode "Endgame (Star Trek: Voyager)" the Future Admiral Janeway warns the present Captain Janeway against holding on to the "Prime Directive" when the Future Janeway goes back in time to change history by having Voyager get back to Earth in only 7 years instead of 23 years.

Films 
In the feature film Star Trek: Insurrection, Picard violates orders to protect the rights of a planet's population when he feels an admiral is breaking the Prime Directive.
In the feature film Star Trek Into Darkness, Captain Kirk violates the prime directive by saving Spock's life while attempting to stop an active volcano that threatens the native inhabitants, and then by exposing the Enterprise to those inhabitants.

Criticism
The Prime Directive has been criticized in-universe because of the inconsistencies in which it is applied. In the TOS episodes "Friday's Child," "For the World Is Hollow and I Have Touched the Sky," "The Cloud Minders," "The Apple," "The Return of the Archons," "Space Seed" and "A Taste of Armageddon," the crew of the Enterprise either interferes with laws or customs of alien worlds or outright colonizes an alien planet to achieve a Federation objective, to save the lives of the crew, or to better the lives of the inhabitants.

Out-of-universe criticisms focus on the above problems; that the Prime Directive is simply a plot device and is manipulated by the writers. Janet D. Stemwedel points out a potential conflict between the anti-colonialist intentions of the Federation and the "ethical project of sharing a universe" which would require "a kind of reciprocity — even if your technological attainment is quite different, it means recognizing you are owed the same moral consideration." Stemwedel writes, "If your concern is not to change the natural behavior or development of alien citizens at any cost, your best bet is to stay at home rather than to explore new worlds." Ars Technica asked lawyers to comment on the Prime Directive and other Star Trek legal issues. Criticism included interpreting the Prime Directive as a product of the Cold War environment in which Roddenberry wrote as well as indicating that enforcement would be lacking.

Temporal Prime Directive
The "Temporal Prime Directive" is a fictional guideline for time travelers (from the past or future) from interfering in the natural development of a timeline.

In the TNG episode "A Matter of Time", Picard compares the Prime Directive to a possible Temporal Prime Directive: 
"Of course, you know of the Prime Directive, which tells us that we have no right to interfere with the natural evolution of alien worlds. Now I have sworn to uphold it, but nevertheless I have disregarded that directive on more than one occasion because I thought it was the right thing to do. Now, if you are holding on to some temporal equivalent of that directive, then isn't it possible that you have an occasion here to make an exception, to help me to choose, because it's the right thing to do?"

As 31st-century time traveler Daniels revealed to Captain Jonathan Archer in the Star Trek: Enterprise episode "Cold Front", as time travel technology became practical, the Temporal Accords were established sometime before the 31st century, to allow the use of time travel for the purposes of studying history, while prohibiting the use of it to alter history.

See also
 Cargo cult
 Law in Star Trek
 The Songs of Distant Earth
 Cultural Relativism
 Three Laws of Robotics
 Fermi Paradox
 Zoo hypothesis

References

External links

Fictional laws
Star Trek politics
Star Trek terminology